Kelechukwu Nnajiofor (born 28 February 1990) is a Finnish-Nigerian footballer who currently plays for Atlantis FC.

Career
He moved in January 2008 to Atlantis FC, he comes from AsPa. In January 2010 was on trial at Vålerenga Fotball.

References

External links
 Player Profile

1990 births
Living people
Atlantis FC players
Nigerian footballers
Nigerian expatriates in Finland
Association football midfielders